This is a list of American television-related events in 1951.

Events

Television programs

Debuts

Changes of network affiliation

Ending this year

Television stations

Station launches

Network affiliation changes

Births

Deaths

References

External links 
List of 1951 American television series at IMDb